Numa or NUMA may refer to:

 Non-uniform memory access (NUMA), in computing

Places
 Numa Falls, a waterfall in Kootenay National Park, Canada
 15854 Numa, a main-belt asteroid

United States
 Numa, Indiana
 Numa, Iowa
 Numa, Oklahoma
 Numa Peak, a mountain in the Glacier National Park, Montana

People
 Numa Andoire (1908–1994), French football defender and manager
 Numa Ayrinhac (1881–1951), Franco-Argentine artist
 Numa Coste (1843-1907), French painter and journalist.
 Numa Denis Fustel de Coulanges (1830–1889), French historian
 Numa Droz (1844–1899), Swiss politician
 Numa Edward Hartog (1846–1871), British academic and activist
 Numa F. Montet (1892–1985), American politician
 Numa François Gillet (fl. 1868–1935), French painter
 Numa Lavanchy (born 1993), Swiss football midfielder
 Numa Marcius, first Pontifex Maximus of Ancient Rome
 Numa Morikazu (1843–1890), Meiji era Japanese politician
 Numa Pompilio Llona (1832–1907), Ecuadorian poet, journalist, educator, diplomat, and philosopher
 Numa Pompilius (753–673 BC), second king of Rome
 Numa S. Trivas (fl. 1899–1949), Russian-American art historian and collector
 Numa Sadoul (born 1947), French writer, actor, and director
, Japanese footballer
 Mauro Numa (born 1961), Italian fencer
 Shosaku Numa (1929–1992), Japanese neuroscientist

Other uses
 National Underwater and Marine Agency, an organization in the United States (namesake of a fictional US government organization in novels by Clive Cussler)
 Northern Paiute people, who call themselves Numa
 Numa, a performing lion who was raised at Gay's Lion Farm in El Monte, California, US
 , English whaling, transport, and merchant ship
 Cyclone Numa, a Mediterranean tropical-like cyclone in November 2017, which had subtropical characteristics

See also
 Numa Numa (disambiguation)
 Nuclear mitotic apparatus protein 1, encoded by the NUMA1 gene

Japanese-language surnames